Siphlonurus phyllis is a species of primitive minnow mayfly in the family Siphlonuridae. It is found in all of Canada and the northern United States.

References

Siphlonuridae
Articles created by Qbugbot
Insects described in 1923